Roosebeck is a hamlet in South Lakeland, Cumbria, England, on the north west coast of Morecambe Bay. It is in the civil parish of Aldingham.

Roosebeck is on the A5087 road, the coastal route from Ulverston to Barrow-in-Furness via Rampside, and is in the south west corner of South Lakeland district: immediately to its west is the boundary of the Borough of Barrow-in-Furness.

A Wesleyan Methodist chapel was opened at Roosebeck in 1879, closed in 1962, and has since been demolished. In 1870 seven human skeletons, arranged in two rows, and a celt (stone tool) were found at Roosebeck.

References

Hamlets in Cumbria
Populated coastal places in Cumbria
Aldingham